The badminton competition at the 1970 British Commonwealth Games took place in Edinburgh, Scotland from 16 July until 21 July 1970.

Final results

Results

Men's singles

Women's singles

Men's doubles

Women's doubles

Mixed doubles

References

1970
1970 British Commonwealth Games events
1970 in badminton
Badminton tournaments in Scotland